Opharus tricyphoides is a moth of the family Erebidae first described by Walter Rothschild in 1909. It is found in Brazil, Peru and Costa Rica.

References

Moths described in 1909
Opharus
Moths of Central America
Moths of South America